Four historic sites within the St. John's Catholic Cemetery  near Zeeland, North Dakota, United States, identified as St. John's Cemetery, Wrought-Iron Cross Site A, St. John's Cemetery, Wrought-Iron Cross Site B, Site C, and Site D, were listed on the National Register of Historic Places in 1989.  They include wrought-iron crosses.  The listing for Site A included 9 contributing objects; Site B included 6;  Site C included just one; Site D included 9. Site C included an iron cross built in 1923 by Jacob Friedt.

Jacob Friedt, of Zeeland, was one of a number of "German-Russian blacksmiths in central North Dakota" who developed individual styles in their crosses and whose "work was known for miles around them."

References

Cemeteries on the National Register of Historic Places in North Dakota
Roman Catholic cemeteries in the United States
German-Russian culture in North Dakota
National Register of Historic Places in McIntosh County, North Dakota
1923 establishments in North Dakota